The Salon Frédéric Chopin is a small museum dedicated to Frédéric Chopin. It is located within the Polish Library in Paris - Bibliothèque polonaise de Paris - in the 4th arrondissement of Paris at 6, Quai d'Orléans, Paris, France. Guided visits are available Thursday afternoons and Saturday mornings by prior appointment; an admission fee is charged.

The museum contains a number of Chopin's mementos, including his death mask and a casting of his left hand by Auguste Clésinger, several paintings, numerous portraits, autographs, first editions, and his favorite chair. The museum occupies one room in the Bibliothèque Polonaise à Paris, which also houses the Musée Adam Mickiewicz and the Musée Boleslas Biegas.

See also 
 List of museums in Paris
 List of music museums

References 
 Bibliothèque Polonaise à Paris
 Paris.org description
 Paris Visites, Petit Futé, 2007, page 27. .

Museums in Paris
Buildings and structures in the 4th arrondissement of Paris
Chopin
Music museums in France
Monuments and memorials to Frédéric Chopin
Museums of Polish culture abroad